The Bravos is a 1972 American Western television film directed by Ted Post and starring George Peppard.

Plot
The commander of an isolated frontier cavalry post tries to stop an Indian war and find his son, who has been kidnapped.

Cast
 George Peppard as Major John David Harkness
 Pernell Roberts as Jackson Buckley
 Belinda Montgomery as Heller Chase 
 L.Q. Jones as Ben Lawler
 George Murdock as Captain MacDowell
 Barry Brown as Garratt
 Dana Elcar as Captain Detroville
 John Kellogg as Sgt Major Marcy
 Bo Svenson as Raeder
 Vincent Van Patten as Peter Harkness
 Joaquín Martínez as Santanta (as Joanquin Martinez)
 Randolph Mantooth as 2nd Lt Lewis
 Clint Ritchie as Corporal Love
 Michael Bow as Sgt Boyd

References

External links
 

1972 television films
1970s English-language films
1972 Western (genre) films
American Western (genre) television films
Films directed by Ted Post